The Bluegum House hyena trap is a provincial heritage site in Graaf-Reinet in the Eastern Cape province of South Africa.

In 1977 it was described in the Government Gazette as

References
 South African Heritage Resource Agency database

Buildings and structures in the Eastern Cape